Tomahawk is an American-based rock band. From their formation in 1999 and up until 2014, Tomahawk recorded 53 songs. Numerous other artists also recorded under the Tomahawk moniker.

Three of the songs are singles, while the other fifty have appeared on one of Tomahawk’s four studio albums.

List of studio songs

Live covers

Other songs

See also 
List of songs recorded by Faith No More

References

Notes 
1.  Estimates made from available setlists, not necessarily accurate.
2.  As of September 6, 2013.

Tomahawk